is a Japanese singer-songwriter. She is best known for her song "Sky Chord (Otona ni Naru Kimi e)," which was used as the ending theme song for the anime Bleach (the 18th song to be used for the ending credits of the anime).

Biography 

Tsuji began writing lyrics in elementary school, and at 15 started playing the guitar. At this time, she starting composing music to set to the lyrics she had written at nine years of age. In order to pursue a career in music, she dropped out of high school in her first year. Half a year after this, she started performing at many different live houses, and at 17 recorded her first demo CD.

In November 2008, she debuted under DefStar Records with the single "Candy Kicks".

Discography

Albums

Singles

References

External links 
 Official site 
 Official blog 

Living people
Japanese women singer-songwriters
Japanese singer-songwriters
1990 births
People from Yokohama
Defstar Records artists
21st-century Japanese singers
21st-century Japanese women singers